Farmgate is a area in Dhaka, the capital of Bangladesh. It is one of the busiest and most crowded areas of Dhaka city. From the early 90s', the area has seen the massive building and construction boom. Consequently, the area has gained commercial importance and has become one of the major transportation hubs of Dhaka from where anyone can travel to all other parts of the city as well as throughout the country. Line 6 of the Dhaka Metro Rail has a station there. Today Farmgate has become more of a commercial area than a residential area. Neighboring places of Farmgate are Kawran Bazar, Pantapath, National Parliament, Rajabazar, etc.

The name came to be because of a farm that used to exist in the area.

Feature

Farmgate is the nerve center of Dhaka city. As a major commercial area of Dhaka, Farmgate serves as one of the significant business hubs of the city. Many Governmental offices, NGOs (Non-Government Organisations), educational institutions, commercial and financial institutions are located at Farmgate. Furthermore, Ananda Cinema Hall, one of the city's popular and traditionally renowned movie theaters, is located here. Green Road is the main street of this area, extending from the Farmgate footbridge to Pantapath. Department of Agricultural Extension, commonly known as Khamarbari, is situated in Farmgate. Traffic congestion is a common scene of Farmgate. As a transportation hub of Dhaka, the area most often remains crowded and thousands of cars, rickshaws, minibuses, buses, trucks remain stranded for even hours in the roads and streets of Farmgate. The majority of the inhabitants of Farmgate work in service industries or businesses. Dhaka's largest sanitary market and Green Super Market are here. Another highly crowded market, known as Sezan Market is located right beside the Farmgate footbridge.  With numerous markets, offices, and immense traffic jams, one can take a glimpse and find the ambiance of Dhaka by going to Farmgate.

Education
There are several educational institutions located at Farmgate. The most renowned include:

Schools

Government Science High School
Tejgaon Government High School
Tejgaon Government Girls High School
Holy Cross High School
Nazneen School

Colleges

Holy Cross College
Government Science College
Tejgaon College
Ideal Commerce College
Nazneen College

References

External links 
 Bangladesh Agricultural Research Council (BARC)
 Cotton Development Board

Dhaka